Connor Kok-Wy Joe (born August 16, 1992) is a Chinese-American professional baseball first baseman and outfielder for the Pittsburgh Pirates of Major League Baseball (MLB). He has previously played in MLB for the San Francisco Giants and Colorado Rockies.

Amateur career
Joe attended Poway High School in San Diego, California, and played college baseball at the University of San Diego. In the summer of 2011, he played with the Kelowna Falcons of the West Coast League prior to attending the University of San Diego. Then in 2013, he played collegiate summer baseball with the Chatham Anglers of the Cape Cod Baseball League, and was named a league all-star.

Professional career

Pittsburgh Pirates
Joe was drafted by the Pittsburgh Pirates in the first round, 39th overall, of the 2014 Major League Baseball draft.

Joe made his professional debut in 2015 with the West Virginia Power, and batted .245/.366/.303 on the year. He spent the 2016 season in High-A with the Bradenton Marauders, slashing .277/.351/392 in 107 games. After the 2016 season, he played in the Arizona Fall League. Joe was assigned to the Double-A Altoona Curve to begin the 2017 season.

Atlanta Braves
On August 5, 2017, Joe was traded to the Atlanta Braves in exchange for Sean Rodriguez. In 20 games with the Double-A Mississippi Braves, Joe had a .135 batting average.

Los Angeles Dodgers
On September 25, 2017, Joe was traded to the Los Angeles Dodgers in exchange for international bonus pool money. He split the 2018 season between the Double-A Tulsa Drillers and the Triple-A Oklahoma City Dodgers, slashing .299/.408/.527 with career-highs in home runs (17) and RBI (55).

San Francisco Giants
Joe was selected by the Cincinnati Reds in the 2018 Rule 5 draft. On March 21, 2019, the Reds traded Joe to the San Francisco Giants in exchange for Jordan Johnson and cash considerations. Joe was designated for assignment on April 8 after only getting 1 hit in 16 plate appearances.

Second stint with Dodgers

Joe cleared waivers and was returned to the Dodgers on April 13. Joe spent the remainder of the season in Triple-A with Oklahoma City, and batted .300/.427/.503 with 15 home runs and 68 RBI. Joe opted out of the 2020 season after being diagnosed with testicular cancer. He became a free agent on November 2, 2020.

Colorado Rockies
On November 20, 2020, Joe signed a minor league contract with the Colorado Rockies organization. On May 7, 2021, Joe was selected to the active roster. Joe played first base while also playing left field, finishing the season hitting .285 with eight home runs and 35 RBI in 63 games.

Pittsburgh Pirates
On December 18, 2022, Joe was traded to the Pittsburgh Pirates in exchange for Nick Garcia.

Personal life
Joe's parents are Mee-Sun and Peter Joe. He is of Chinese heritage. His grandparents emigrated from China: his father's family moved to Connecticut and his mother’s family moved to New York. After his parents married, they moved to Poway, California, a suburb of San Diego. His family owned and operated two restaurants in San Diego.

Joe and his wife Kylie reside in Arizona.

On March 18, 2020, Joe announced he had undergone surgery for testicular cancer and was in his recovery process. He was declared cancer free on July 20, 2020.

See also
Rule 5 draft results

References

External links

San Diego Toreros bio

1992 births
Living people
Baseball players from San Diego
Major League Baseball outfielders
San Francisco Giants players
Colorado Rockies players
San Diego Toreros baseball players
Chatham Anglers players
West Virginia Power players
Surprise Saguaros players
Bradenton Marauders players
Altoona Curve players
West Virginia Black Bears players
Mississippi Braves players
Tulsa Drillers players
Oklahoma City Dodgers players
American baseball players of Chinese descent
Duluth Huskies players
American baseball players of Korean descent